Mount Pleasant is an unincorporated community located along County Route 519 on the border of Alexandria Township and Holland Township, in Hunterdon County, New Jersey. The Mount Pleasant Historic District was listed on the National Register of Historic Places in 1987.

History
The Presbyterian church was organized  and worshipped in a log meeting house. The Mount Pleasant school was started before 1790. By the 1880s, the community had a post office, two stores, a mill, a blacksmith and a tavern.

Historic district

The Mount Pleasant Historic District is a  historic district encompassing the community along County Route 519 (Little York–Mount Pleasant Road) and Rick Road. It was added to the National Register of Historic Places on November 16, 1987 for its significance in agriculture, architecture, commerce, settlement, and industry. It includes 34 contributing buildings.

The Presbyterian Church, built in 1843, and the general store, built in the 1860s, feature vernacular Greek Revival style.

See also
 National Register of Historic Places listings in Hunterdon County, New Jersey

References

External links
 
 
 

Alexandria Township, New Jersey
Holland Township, New Jersey
Unincorporated communities in Hunterdon County, New Jersey
Unincorporated communities in New Jersey
National Register of Historic Places in Hunterdon County, New Jersey
Historic districts on the National Register of Historic Places in New Jersey
New Jersey Register of Historic Places